Kenneth Walter Samuel Nethercott (22 July 1925 - 14 December 2007) was an English professional footballer who played as a goalkeeper.

Nethercott began his career as an amateur with Cardiff City before signing a professional contract with Norwich City in 1947. He stayed at Carrow Road for 12 years, making 416 appearances for the Canaries; 378 in the league.

On 14 December 2007, Norwich City announced Nethercott's death at the age of 82.

References

Sources
Canary Citizens by Mark Davage, John Eastwood, Kevin Platt, published by Jarrold Publishing, (2001), 

1925 births
2007 deaths
Footballers from Bristol
English footballers
England B international footballers
Cardiff City F.C. players
Norwich City F.C. players
Association football goalkeepers